Gun Hill Road is a major thoroughfare in the New York City borough of the Bronx. Van Cortlandt Park and the Mosholu Golf Course are both located at the western terminus of Gun Hill Road.

Street description 
The west end of Gun Hill Road is at the Mosholu Parkway, where the road continues west as Van Cortlandt Park South toward Manhattan College. After an intersection with Jerome Avenue, Gun Hill Road passes to the south of the Mosholu Golf Course. Also, the road name officially changes from West Gun Hill Road to East Gun Hill Road. At an intersection with DeKalb Avenue in Norwood, the road passes by the North Central Bronx Hospital and the Montefiore Medical Center. Northwest of there, the road acts as the southern border of Woodlawn Cemetery. At Webster Avenue, Gun Hill Road passes the Williams Bridge station of the Metro-North Railroad. Soon after, the road crosses over the Bronx River Parkway, at exit 9. The following major intersection is White Plains Road, which Gun Hill Road intersects within Williamsbridge Square.

As the road and enters Williamsbridge, there is an intersection with Boston Road, which carries U.S. 1. Now entering the neighborhood of Baychester, the road intersects with Edson and Ely avenues, in which the former acts as the southbound service road for the New England Thruway. Directly after, the road intersects with exit 10 for Interstate 95. The road becomes one-way for 0.2 miles (0.3 kilometers) and intersects with Waring Avenue. The road terminates at an intersection with Stillwell Avenue and exit 4S of the Hutchinson River Parkway.

History 
During the American Revolution, the road was an important artery over which the British and the colonists fought. In January 1777, the colonists brought a cannon to the top of a hill and fired at the British. The hill, now inside Woodlawn Cemetery, was locally called Gun Hill afterwards. The road was known as Kingsbridge Road (part of the original Boston Post Road) until 1875, when it was renamed Gun Hill Road. It did not originally extend east of White Plains Road but was extended by segments to the Hutchinson River, by 1938.

In 1941, the New York City Planning Department proposed the Gun Hill Crosstown Highway as an upgrade, but nothing happened with this plan. In the mid-1960s, the Tri-State Transportation Commission proposed a new route just a mile north of Gun Hill Road called the City Line Expressway; this plan also did not advance.

Transportation

Commuter rail
The Williams Bridge station, a former New York Central Railroad station, now serves the Metro-North Railroad's Harlem Line. It is located near the intersection with Bronx River Parkway.

Subway

There are two New York City Subway stations on Gun Hill Road:
Gun Hill Road on the IRT White Plains Road Line at White Plains Road, serving the 
Gun Hill Road on the IRT Dyre Avenue Line at Seymour Avenue, serving the

Bus
Several buses travel on Gun Hill Road. The primary routes that traverse the corridor are the Bx28 and Bx38.

Major intersections

See also

References

Streets in the Bronx